The  is a professional golf tournament on the Japan Golf Tour. It was co-sanctioned by the Asian Tour form 2008 to 2020. Hosted by Panasonic, the event took place for the first time in September 2008 at Ibaraki Country Club in Ibaraki, Osaka, Japan.

Winners

Notes

References

External links
 
Coverage on the Japan Golf Tour's official site
Coverage on the Asian Tour's official site

Japan Golf Tour events
Former Asian Tour events
Golf tournaments in Japan
Recurring sporting events established in 2008